Ivan Lendl was the defending champion and won in the final 6–3, 6–2 against Boris Becker.

Seeds
The top eight seeds received a bye to the second round.

  Ivan Lendl (champion)
  Stefan Edberg (semifinals)
  Boris Becker (final)
  John McEnroe (semifinals)
  Tim Mayotte (second round)
  Pete Sampras (third round)
  Guy Forget (third round)
  Wally Masur (second round)
  Christo van Rensburg (quarterfinals)
  Henri Leconte (first round)
  David Wheaton (quarterfinals)
  Richard Fromberg (quarterfinals)
  Kevin Curren (second round)
  Alex Antonitsch (third round)
  Scott Davis (third round)
  Mark Kratzmann (first round)

Draw

Finals

Top half

Section 1

Section 2

Bottom half

Section 3

Section 4

External links
 1990 Stella Artois Championships draw

Singles